Po Lam is the northern terminus MTR station of the . It is located on Mau Yip Road, Po Lam, in the New Territories of Hong Kong, sandwiched by Phases 1 to 3 of Metro City. Built by Maeda Corporation, it opened on 18 August 2002. The name of the station is taken from the nearby Po Lam Road North.

Station layout 

Tracks ascend from underground to ground level at the southern end of the station, along King Lam Estate. A park is located on top of the tracks to cover them.

Platforms 
There is only one side platform (Platform 1) from which trains depart, in the same direction as they arrive. Trains, as a result, halt on their way from Hang Hau station for another train to depart at the station. Trains also stay here for a shorter period before departing than at other MTR terminals. The single-track design (and the consequent longer train turnback time) limits the maximum train service frequency of the Tseung Kwan O line.

Across from the platform and north of the point where the tracks merge to one, there is a siding that splits from the running line for parking trains. Trains cannot access the platform from the siding, nor can they access the siding from the platform.

Entrances/exits 
The main exit is on Mau Yip Road, where five pedestrian footbridges link the station to a public transport interchange, shopping malls and residential buildings. There is direct access to Metro City and The Pinnacle from the concourse. Another footbridge crosses Po Fung Road and leads to Po Lam Estate, Yan Ming Court and Verbena Heights.
A1: Metro City Plaza III 
A2: Metro City Plaza II 
B1: Metro City Plaza II
B2: Metro City Plaza I
B3: King Lam Estate
C: Mau Yip Road

Station artwork

Future development 

References

External links 

MTR stations in the New Territories
Tseung Kwan O line
Po Lam
Railway stations in Hong Kong opened in 2002